Crni Dabar is an uninhabited settlement in Croatia.

References 

Ghost towns in Croatia